The Czech folk and tramping  group Brontosauři was founded in 1972 by brothers Jan and František Nedvěd. It was the successor of the band Toronto, based in the town of Jílové u Prahy. Thanks to the expressive creativity of the Nedvěd brothers, the band quickly became very popular, especially after the Porta Music Festival. Later, more musicians, each of whom were also members of the more popular band Spirituál kvintet, joined the brothers. Today, Brontosauři is a folk music legend in the Czech Republic. The band broke up in 1994 after the release of their last album, Zahrádky.

Band members
 Jan Nedvěd - vocals, guitar
 František Nedvěd - vocals, guitar
 Jiří Bartoň
 Alexander Bezega
 Gustav Blažek - banjo
 Jitka Marková
 Luboš Schuss
 Zdena Tosková (later known as Zdena Tichotová) - vocals
 Petr Zadina - double bass
 Dušan Vančura - double bass

Timeline

Discography
Studio albums
 Na kameni kámen (1986)
 Ptáčata (1987}
 Sedmikráska (1992)
 Zahrádky (1994)

Compilations
 Hlídej lásku, skálo má (2001)

References

Czech folk music groups
1972 establishments in Czechoslovakia
1994 disestablishments in the Czech Republic
Musical groups established in 1972
Musical groups disestablished in 1994